Pierre Bouvier (14 April 1934 – 27 July 2003) was a French bobsledder. He competed in the four-man event at the 1956 Winter Olympics.

References

1934 births
2003 deaths
French male bobsledders
Olympic bobsledders of France
Bobsledders at the 1956 Winter Olympics